Boots and Saddles is an American Western television series that aired in syndication from 1957 to 1959.

Synopsis

Set in 1870, the series depicts activities of the U.S. Fifth Cavalry, with the title taken from the bugle call that alerted cavalrymen to their horses. The setting is fictional Fort Lowell, near Tucson, Arizona.

The cast includes John Pickard (billed as Jack Pickard) as Captain Shank Adams, Patrick McVey as Lieutenant Colonel Hayes, Gardner McKay as Lieutenant Kelly, David Willock as Lieutenant Binning, John Alderson as Sergeant Bullock, and Mike Hinn as scout Luke Cummings. Johnny Western has a continuing role on the series.

Production
The series was shot in Kanab Canyon in Utah. The series was produced by California National Productions and sold by NBC Film Division.

Robert Cinader created the show, which was produced by California Studios with George Cahan was executive producer. Anthony Ellis was the writer. 

The technical advisor was Col. J. S. Peters, Retired, U.S. Cavalry.

Critical response
A review of the first episode of Boots and Saddles in the trade publication Billboard said that the program's action "ought to make the kids happy" while "At the same time it's done intelligently, with a sense of reality that should snare the adults."

Episode list

Adaptations
 adapted the TV series into a comic strip.

Notes

References

External links
 
 www.westernclippings.com

1957 American television series debuts
1958 American television series endings
Fiction set in 1871
Television series set in the 1870s
Black-and-white American television shows
English-language television shows
First-run syndicated television programs in the United States
Television shows set in Tucson, Arizona
Television shows filmed in Utah
1950s Western (genre) television series
Television shows adapted into comics
Television series about the United States Army